The Quaket River is a tidal inlet, in the U.S. state of Rhode Island. It flows approximately 1 km (.6 mi) from the mouth of Nannaquaket Pond into the Sakonnet River. It is located entirely within the town of Tiverton, Rhode Island.

Crossings
Nannaquaket Road in Tiverton is the only crossing over the Quaket River.

Tributaries
The Quaket River has no direct named tributaries, however Nannaquaket Pond (the river's source) is fed by Quaket Creek, Sin-and-Flesh Brook and White Wine Brook.

See also
List of rivers in Rhode Island
Sakonnet River

References
Maps from the United States Geological Survey

Rivers of Newport County, Rhode Island
Tiverton, Rhode Island
Rivers of Rhode Island